Pheran Day (also International Pheran Day or World Pheran Day) is celebrated in Kashmir on 21 December as first day of Chillai Kalan.

It was proposed to be celebrated every year in 1931 general convention of National Conference when a young leader from Shopian namely Abdul Sadiq Shah put the motion first in a move to resist against tyrannical rule which had tried to ban Pheran. Sheikh Abdullah and other leaders however initially supported the consortium but when Prime Minister confirmed culture-things are not going to be banned, the idea of Pheran Day celebration was dropped subsequently. 11

History
The Pheran Day is celebrated for the preservation of tradition of wearing Pheran. In 2020, the tourism department in Pakistan administered Kashmir celebrated "Kangri and Pheran Day" on 19 February to promote Kashmiri culture on the one hand and express solidarity with the struggling people of Indian administered Kashmir on the other. On 21 December 2021, member of The Jammu and Kashmir Economic Confederation (JKEC) assembled at Ghanta Ghar Lal Chowk to observe 'Pheran Day'. Bollywood actor Anupam Kher also wished Kashmiri people on "World Pheran Day." In 2022, Pheran Day was celebrated at historic Ghanta Ghar. The main aim of this day was to popularise the loose-and-long woollen gown worn to fight the biting cold as the minimum temperature hovers below sub-zero in various parts of Kashmir valley. Various tourists and locals cat-walked near Lal Chowk to promote "wearing Pheran".

References

Indian clothing
Culture of Jammu and Kashmir
Kashmir